Mitti Wajaan Maardi, (English: The Soil Calls, 2007) is an Indian Punjabi film directed by Manmohan Singh.

Plot 
There is a moving saga of Punjabis who go abroad for better prospects but circumstances prevent them from returning to their homeland. One such story focuses on Surjit Singh who goes to America leaving behind his wife and two-year-old daughter. But to get American citizenship he has to marry for a second time. This act breaks his relationship with his family back home in Punjab.

Now a wealthy man, Surjit hopes his son, Varyam, will marry the daughter of his best friend back in Punjab but his plans are soon put on hold when he discovers he is dying. On his death bed Surjit reveals the truth of his first marriage to his son, and begs him to make things right with his first family. Little does Varyam know that doing so will completely change his life.

Cast 
Harbhajan Mann
Japji Khera
Gurpreet Ghuggi
Mahi Gill
Rana Ranbir
Binnu Dhillon
Dolly Minhas
Kanwaljit
Vivek Shauq
Jagmit Bhalla
Jagmit Kokri

References

External links 
 

2007 films
Punjabi-language Indian films
2000s Punjabi-language films